The Imperial German Army  Zeppelin LZ 76 (L-m33) was a R-class World War I zeppelin.

Operational history
On 23 September 1916 a bombing raid was planned for London. That night, a Zeppelin group (LZ 72 [L 31], L 32, L 33 and L 34) set out to complete the mission. They succeeded in dropping  of bombs on London and surrounding counties. On its first mission, anti-aircraft damaged LZ 76 its commander Kapitan-Leutnant Alois Bocker changed its course over Essex. It was here that the airship was attacked by 39 Home Defence Squadron night fighters from Hainault Farm. Alfred Brandon was flying a B.E.2e fighter when he attacked Zeppelin LZ 76, helping to bring the airship down in a field. Even after dropping guns and equipment, Bocker calculated that the ship would not make it safely across the North Sea, and he landed in Little Wigborough, Essex, the morning of 24 September 1916 with no fatalities. Right away, the crew set out to destroy the airship but were only partly successful in burning the hull. British engineers examined the skeleton and later used the plans as a basis for the construction of airships R33 and R34.

Specifications (LZ 76 / Type R zeppelin)

See also

 List of Zeppelins

References

Footnotes

Bibliography 

 
 
 
 

Accidents and incidents involving balloons and airships
Airships of Germany
Aviation accidents and incidents in 1916
Hydrogen airships
Zeppelins